Korf Poshteh-ye Tazehabad (also Romanized as Korf Poshteh-ye Tāzehābād; also known as Karaf Poshteh and Karpushte) is a village in Tutaki Rural District, in the Central District of Siahkal County, Gilan Province, Iran. At the 2006 census, its population was 192, in 48 families.

References 

Populated places in Siahkal County